Rodney Peter Croome AM is an Australian LGBT rights activist and academic. He worked on the campaign to decriminalise homosexuality in Tasmania, was a founder of Australian Marriage Equality, and currently serves as the spokesperson for the Tasmanian Gay and Lesbian Rights Group and a spokesperson for LGBT advocacy group Just.Equal.

Early life
Croome grew up on a dairy farm in Tasmania's North West and studied European History at the University of Tasmania, graduating with a Bachelor of Arts in 1988.

Activism

Tasmania
Croome was the founding president and long-term board member of the Tasmanian LGBT support organisation, 'Working It Out' as well as serving on various other similar organisations and had been in a leading role in the establishing challenging-homophobia education in Tasmanian state schools and in the Tasmanian Police, as well as the instituting of anti-discrimination laws in Tasmania. He also fronted the successful campaign to decriminalise homosexuality in Tasmania, which until 1 May 1997 was a criminal offence punishable by up to 25 years in jail. That campaign saw Tasmanian activists take their case to the United Nations (Toonen v Australia), the Federal Government and the High Court. In 1997 in the case of Croome v Tasmania, Croome applied to the High Court of Australia for a ruling as to whether the Tasmanian laws were inconsistent with the Federal Human Rights (Sexual Conduct) Act (1994). The Tasmanian Government repealed the relevant Criminal Code provisions after failing in its attempts to have the matter struck out. In 2009, Croome was named one of the 25 most influential gay Australians by readers of the website samesame.com.au.

Croome called for reviews of blood donors processes, saying the screening process of blood donors did not question heterosexuals on their safe sex practices, but singled out gay and bisexual men as high risk: "It's really time for the Red Cross to change its policy and focus on whether donors have safe or unsafe sex rather than the gender of the person they have sex with."

Same-sex marriage
Croome was one of the first advocates in Australia to raise the issue of same-sex marriage circa 2004, at a time when it wasn't a popular topic of discussion both within the LGBTI community and more broadly.  Despite opposition to the idea of marriage equality, Croome would commit the next 13 years of his life fighting for marriage equality for all Australians.

In 2010, Croome co-authored a book presenting the cases for and against marriage equality, entitled WHY vs WHY: Gay Marriage (Pantera Press).

In 2012, Croome became the fifth National Director of Australian Marriage Equality.  On 8 May 2013 Croome debated Patrick Langrell on Same Sex Marriage at the University of New South Wales. In September 2013 Rodney Croome wrote to the group Community Action Against Homophobia CAAH expressing his concerns in regards to the radical campaigning methods they use in same-sex marriage campaigns saying, "It is a double standard to demand respect for same-sex relationships without showing the same respect in return".  Croome supports Australia's trans and intersex communities in their quest for marriage equality saying, "the marriage equality campaign must be inclusive of all loving committed couples regardless of sex, sexual orientation, gender identity or intersex status".

In 2015, Croome released his latest book, "From This Day Forward: Marriage Equality in Australia" (Walleah Press).

In 2015, Tasmanian Archbishop Julius Porteous distributed a political booklet titled, "Don't mess with Marriage" that advised parents to lobby MPs against same-sex marriage. Croome encouraged parents to submit complaints to the Tasmanian Anti-Discrimination Commissioner, stating “I urge everyone who finds it offensive and inappropriate, including teachers, parents and students, to complain to the Anti-Discrimination Commissioner, Robin Banks”. The ABC Media Watch program reported that Croome, along with Christine Forster, had been interviewed 32 times on the subject of same-sex marriage, in the first 12 days of August 2015.

Career
Croome has been the editor of the Tasmanian literary journal, 'Island', a research consultant for the Port Arthur Management Authority and the Australian National University-based Freilich Foundation, and an Honorary lecturer Sociology at the University of Tasmania.

Awards
Croome was made the inaugural recipient of the Tasmanian Humanitarian of the Year Award and awarded the Chris Carter Memorial Award for contributions to the gay and lesbian community by the Australian Democrats in 1991. In 1994, he was shortlisted for Australian of the Year. In January 2001, he was awarded the Centenary Medal for "service and extensive contribution to gay and lesbian law reform" and in June 2003 he was appointed as a Member of the Order of Australia (AM) for "service to the community as a human rights advocate, particularly through promoting tolerance and understanding of the human rights of gay and lesbian people". Croome was named Tasmanian Australian of the Year for 2015, and consequently was a finalist for 2015 Australian of the Year.

Publications

References

External links
Rodney Croome - On Line Opinion Author
Rodney Croome - ABC's The Drum
Australian Marriage Equality (AME) website

Australian bloggers
Members of the Order of Australia
Australian LGBT people
Australian LGBT rights activists
Living people
People from Tasmania
Recipients of the Centenary Medal
University of Tasmania alumni
Academic staff of the University of Tasmania
Year of birth missing (living people)